Be'lakor is an Australian melodic death metal band from Melbourne, Victoria. The band's name originates from the character Be'lakor the Dark Master, in the Warhammer Fantasy game setting.

History
Be'lakor formed as a band in 2004, but did not start playing live shows until 2005. In 2007, the band self-released their debut album, The Frail Tide, which received generally positive reviews. In 2008, Be'lakor signed with Descent Productions, and re-released The Frail Tide in digipack form.  In 2009, Be'lakor embarked on a national tour, and signed with Prime Cuts Music.  Their second album, Stone's Reach, was released on 20 June 2009
and received much praise by reviewers.  In November 2009, Be'lakor signed with Kolony Records.

In March 2010, Be'lakor's album Stone's Reach took first place in Metal Storm's "Best Melodeath/Gothenburg Metal Album" for 2009. Be'lakor also supported Turisas on their national tour of Australia in May. They were the opening act for Alestorm in Melbourne for their "PLUNDER DOWNUNDER” tour in June 2010. The band also performed at the Summer Breeze Open Air Festival in Germany in August 2010.

Be'lakor released their third album Of Breath and Bone in June 2012. They began touring Europe, playing Brutal Assault in the Czech Republic. They also performed at the Summer Breeze Open Air Festival in Germany during August 2012. They supported Apocalyptica in Melbourne during their 2012 Australia tour in September, and At the Gates in Melbourne during their tour in November.

In August 2015, the band returned to Europe and played Brutal Assault in Czechia, Rockstadt Open Air in Romania and Summer Breeze. Matt Dodds of Arbrynth took over lead guitar duties for Shaun due to illness.

On 21 September 2015, the band announced that their fourth album would be released in March 2016. Later, on 29 December, drummer Jimmy Vanden Broeck left the band to pursue other musical ventures. He was replaced by Elliott Sansom, who also performs with Melbourne-based bands Dusk Cult & Okera. On 24 June 2016 Be'lakor released Vessels, the band's fourth album. Coherence followed five years later, on 29 October 2021.

Members
Current members
 George Kosmas – vocals, guitars (2004–present)
 Shaun Sykes – guitars (2004–present)
 Elliott Sansom –  drums (2015–present)
 Steven Merry – keyboards, piano (2004–present)
 John Richardson – bass (2004–present)

Former members
 Jimmy Vanden Broeck – drums (2004–2015)

Touring members
 Matt Dodds – guitars (2015)

Timeline

Endorsements 
 John Richardson, Spector Bass Guitars

Discography
The Frail Tide (2007)
Stone's Reach (2009)
Of Breath and Bone (2012)
Vessels (2016)
Coherence (2021)

Awards and nominations

Music Victoria Awards
The Music Victoria Awards are an annual awards night celebrating Victorian music. They commenced in 2006.

! 
|-
| Music Victoria Awards of 2016
| Vessels
| Best Heavy Album
| 
|rowspan="1"| 
|-

References

External links

Be'lakor at Facebook

Australian melodic death metal musical groups
Musical groups established in 2004
Musical groups from Melbourne
Musical quintets